Pride of the Underdog is the second studio album by English rapper Deeder Zaman, released on 31 October 2011 by Modulor.

Critical response
Mat Ward of Green Left Weekly described Pride of the Underdog as "...warm, wide bass and shuffling sounds from speaker to speaker like shifting sands. Its reversed snares seem to slip through your cranium as they surreally slide from ear to ear."

Track listing

Personnel

Musicians
Deeder Zaman – bass guitar, melodica
Devon White – guitar
Skip McDonald – guitar
Alok Verma – percussion, tabla

Vocals
Deeder Zaman
Devon White
Ghetto Priest
Elaine Cheng

Technical
Vinod Gadher – executive producer
Adrian Sherwood – mix engineer

References

External links

2011 albums
Deeder Zaman albums